Gederovci is a small village in the Municipality of Tišina in the Prekmurje region of northeastern Slovenia, right on the border with Austria.

References

External links 
Gederovci on Geopedia

Populated places in the Municipality of Tišina